Montreal Cathedral may refer to:

 the Anglican Christ Church Cathedral
 the Roman Catholic Mary, Queen of the World Cathedral
 the Roman Catholic former cathedral Saint-Jacques
 the Ukrainian Orthodox  Cathedral of St Sophie
 the Melkite Greek Catholic Saint Sauveur Cathedral